William Talbot (c.1643 – 26 December 1724) was an Irish Jacobite politician. 

Talbot was the son of Garrett Talbot and Margaret Gaydon, and a nephew of Richard Talbot, 1st Earl of Tyrconnell. In 1689 he was the Member of Parliament for Louth in the Patriot Parliament called by James II of England. Upon the death of his uncle in August 1691, he assumed his title as 2nd Earl of Tyrconnell in the Jacobite peerage; a claim never recognised by the English government. Following the Williamite War in Ireland, Talbot was attainted and fled first to France and then to Spain, where he was commonly called Conde de Tyrconnel.

Talbot entered the service of Philip V of Spain and fought in the War of the Spanish Succession. He was aide-de-camp to Philippe II, Duke of Orléans during the Siege of Tortosa (1708).

He married Mary White in May 1689. Their son, Richard Talbot (styled Lord Talbot by Jacobites), married Charlotte, daughter of the 1st Earl of Tyrconnell, in 1702. Talbot's grandson was Richard Francis Talbot.

References

Year of birth uncertain
1724 deaths
17th-century Irish people
18th-century Irish people
Earls in the Jacobite peerage
Irish expatriates in France
Irish expatriates in Spain
Irish Jacobites
Irish MPs 1689
Irish soldiers in the army of James II of England
Irish soldiers in the Spanish Army
Members of the Parliament of Ireland (pre-1801) for County Louth constituencies
People convicted under a bill of attainder
Spanish military personnel of the War of the Spanish Succession
William